Matarraña or Matarranya is a comarca in eastern Aragon, bordering the Spanish Autonomous Communities of Catalonia and Valencia. It is located in Teruel Province, in the mountainous Sistema Ibérico area.

Its capital is Valderrobres, and it borders the Aragonese comarques of Bajo Aragón-Caspe/Baix Aragó-Casp, and Bajo Aragón, the Catalan comarques of Terra Alta, Baix Ebre, and Montsià, and the Valencian comarques of Baix Maestrat and Ports.

This comarca is named after the Matarranya River flowing through it. It belongs to the Catalan-speaking strip in eastern Aragon known as La Franja.

Historical comarca

The historical Matarranya comarca was a natural region that roughly encompassed the whole Matarranya river basin. The historical comarca was split for administrative purposes when provincial boundaries were traced following the territorial division of Spain in 1833.

After the new divisions were created, the northern section, the Lower Matarranya, became part of the Zaragoza Province while the southern part remained in Teruel Province.
This former northern territory, that included the municipalities of Fayón (Faió del Matarranya), Maella and Fabara (Favara del Matarranya), is now the eastern end of the Bajo Aragón-Caspe/Baix Aragó-Casp comarca.

Some of the western municipalities that remained in Teruel Province, Aguaviva (Aiguaviva de Bergantes), Belmonte de San José (Bellmunt de Mesquí), La Cañada de Verich (La Canyada de Beric), La Cerollera (La Sorollera), La Codoñera (La Codonyera), La Ginebrosa and Torrevelilla (La Torre de Vilella) were later segregated from Matarranya and included in the Bajo Aragón comarca.

Municipal terms
The Catalan version of the names of the towns are in brackets.
Arens de Lledó (Arenys de Lledó)
Beceite (Beseit)
Calaceite (Calaceit)
Cretas (Cretes or Queretes)
Fórnoles (Fórnols de Matarranya)
La Fresneda (La Freixneda)
Fuentespalda (Fontdespatla)
Lledó (Lledó d'Algars)
Mazaleón (Massalió)
Monroyo (Mont-roig de Tastavins)
Peñarroya de Tastavins (Pena-roja de Tastavins)
La Portellada
Ráfales (Ràfels)
Torre de Arcas (Torredarques)
Torre del Compte (La Torre del Comte)
Valdeltormo (La Vall de Tormo)
Valderrobres (Vall-de-roures)
Valjunquera (Valljunquera)

See also
 Ilercavonia
 Lower Aragon
 Ports de Tortosa-Beseit
 Roman Catholic Diocese of Tortosa
 The World's Most Extraordinary Homes#Season two (Solo House 2 by Office KGDVS)

References

External links 

Official Comarca of Matarraña/Matarranya website
Matarranya Aragon Guide
El Matarranya
Matarranya Cultural Association
Landscaping Project

 
Comarcas of Aragon
Geography of the Province of Teruel
La Franja